Marguerite River Wildland Provincial Park is a wildland provincial park in Wood Buffalo, northern Alberta, Canada. The park is part of the Lower Athabasca Regional Plan. The park was named for the Marguerite River that flows thru the park and forms a portion of the park's western boundary. The park was originally created in 1998 as Marguerite Crag and Tail Wildland Provincial Park. It was reformed and renamed in 2000.

Location
The park consists of two parcels of land, located east and northeast of Fort McKay, abutting the Saskatchewan border on the east. The northern limits of the park adjoin Richardson Wildland Provincial Park and the Marguerite River. This parcel contains a portion of the Firebag River.

Ecology
The park contains two subregions of the Boreal Forest Natural Region of Alberta: Central Mixedwood and Athabasca Plain; and the Kazan Uplands subregion of the Canadian Shield region. The park contains landscapes unique in Alberta. The Marguerite and Richardson rivers have developed the best examples of braided stream valley in the Boreal Forest Natural Region. An esker standing over  marks the south end of the park. The park also includes a drumlin field and glacial flutes. The Snuff and Otter Lakes area represents the most pristine organic wetlands in Alberta's boreal forest. Within the park is a unique crag and tail landscape with granite crags and glacially deposited gravel tails on the lee side. The crag and tail landscape is part of the Canadian Shield Natural Region. A rare fern (Rock polypody) is found in the crag and tail area. Grizzly bears are found in the park.

Activities
The park has no developed facilities so only wildlife viewing, backcountry hiking, and random backcountry camping are available. Snowmobiles are permitted on existing trails only. Hunting and fishing are allowed with proper permits.

See also
List of provincial parks in Alberta
List of Canadian provincial parks

References

External links
 
 

Parks in Alberta
Regional Municipality of Wood Buffalo